Parco della Musica is a public music complex in Rome, Italy, with three concert halls and an outdoor theater in a park setting. It was designed by Italian architect Renzo Piano. Jürgen Reinhold of Müller-BBM was in charge of acoustics for the halls; Franco Zagari was landscape architect for the outdoor spaces. Parco della Musica lies where the 1960 Summer Olympic Games were held, somewhat north of Rome's ancient center, and is home to most of the facilities of the Accademia Nazionale di Santa Cecilia.

The halls are: Sala Santa Cecilia, with about 2800 seats; Sala Sinopoli, in memory of conductor Giuseppe Sinopoli, seating about 1200 people; and Sala Petrassi, in memory of Goffredo Petrassi, with 700 seats. Structurally separated for sound-proofing, they are nonetheless joined at the base by a continuous lobby. Their outer architectural form has led to nicknames such as “the blobs,” “the beetles,” “the turtles” and “the computer mouses”.) The outdoor theater, called the Cavea, recalls ancient Greek or Roman performance spaces and is fan-shaped around a central piazza.

During construction, excavations uncovered the foundations of a villa and an oil-press dating from the sixth century BC. Renzo Piano then adjusted his design scheme to accommodate the archaeological remains and included a small museum to house artifacts discovered, delaying the project's completion by a year. Parco della Musica was inaugurated on 21 December 2002. Within a few years it became Europe's most-visited music facility. In 2014, it had over two million visitors, making it the second-most-visited cultural music venue in the world, after Lincoln Center in New York.

References

External links
 Accademia Nazionale di Santa Cecilia
  Extensive collection of photos
 Information about Auditorium

2002 establishments in Italy
Buildings and structures in Rome
Accademia Nazionale di Santa Cecilia
Concert halls in Italy
Music venues completed in 2002
Music venues in Italy
Renzo Piano buildings
Rome Q. II Parioli
Theatres in Rome
Theatres completed in 2002
Tourist attractions in Rome